Oakville is a town in Halton Region, Ontario, Canada.  It is located on Lake Ontario between Toronto and Hamilton. At its 2021 census population of 213,759, it is Ontario's largest town. Oakville is part of the Greater Toronto Area, one of the most densely populated areas of Canada.

History

In 1793, Dundas Street was surveyed for a military road. In 1805, the Legislative Assembly of Upper Canada bought the lands between Etobicoke and Hamilton from the indigenous Mississaugas people, except for the land at the mouths of Twelve Mile Creek (Bronte Creek), Sixteen Mile Creek, and along the Credit River. In 1807, British immigrants settled the area surrounding Dundas Street as well as on the shore of Lake Ontario.

In 1820, the Crown bought the area surrounding the waterways. The area around the creeks, ceded to the Crown by the Mississaugas, was auctioned off to William Chisholm in 1827. He left the development of the area to his son, Robert Kerr Chisholm, and his brother-in-law, Merrick Thomas. Chisholm also formed shipbuilding business in Oakville Navy Street and Sixteen Mile Creek (Halton Region) and lasted until 1842, but shipbuilding in Oakville lasted into the late 20th century.

The population in 1846 was 1,500. The community shipped large quantities of wheat and lumber via schooners and the railway. There were three churches, a grist mill and saw mill, and various small companies making threshing machines, wagons, watches, saddles, and metal goods. There were also tradesmen of various types.

Oakville's industries also included shipbuilding. In the 1850s, there was an economic recession and the foundry, the most important industry in town, was closed. Basket-making became a major industry in the town, and the Grand Trunk Railway was built through it. In 1869, the population was 2,000. The community was served by the Great Western Railway and it was a port on Lake Ontario.

The town eventually became industrialized with the opening of Cities Service Canada (later BP Canada, and now Petro Canada) and Shell Canada oil refineries (both now closed), the Procor factory (no longer manufacturing), and, most importantly, the Ford Motor Company's Canadian headquarters and plant, all close to the Canadian National Railway and the Queen Elizabeth Way highway between Toronto and Fort Erie (Buffalo).

In 1962, the town of Oakville merged with its neighbouring villages (Bronte, Palermo, Sheridan, and the remainder of Trafalgar Township) to become the new Town of Oakville, reaching northwards to Steeles Avenue in Milton. In 1973, the restructuring of Halton County into Halton Region brought the northern border southwards to just north of the future Highway 407.

Geography

Neighbourhoods
Oakville's Planning Department divides the town into communities. These are based on traditional neighbourhoods.

Climate
Like much of Southern Ontario, Oakville has a Humid continental climate straddling Dfa/Dfb classifications, with cold, but not extreme, winters and warm, to very warm summers. Like most lakeside municipalities on the Great Lakes, there are varying temperatures within town boundaries, generally warmer days further from the lake, the exception being on the colder days in winter.

Demographics

According to the 2016 Census, the median age in the town is 41.7 years. 18.9% of the population is under 15 years of age, 66.5% is between 15 to 64 years, and 14.5% is 65 and over.

In 2016, immigrants made up 35.9% of the population. The top 10 places of birth of the immigrant population were the United Kingdom (11%), China (9.3%), India (7.6%), Pakistan (4.2%), Poland (3.8%), Philippines (3.7%), the United States (3.4%), Portugal (3.3%), Egypt (3.1%), and South Korea (2.9%).

Language 
The most common mother tongues among the population in 2016 were English (64.1%), Mandarin (3.9%), Arabic (2.4%), and Spanish (2.2%).

Ethnicity 

 
The 2016 Census found the most reported ethnocultural background to be White (68.5%), followed by South Asian (8.9%), Chinese (7%), Arab (3.2%), Black (2.9%), Filipino (1.9%), Latin American (1.9%), Korean (1.6%), West Asian (1.1%), and other backgrounds. Aboriginals make up 0.7% the population: 0.4% First Nations and 0.3% Métis.

Note: Totals greater than 100% due to multiple origin responses.

Religion 
According to the 2011 Census, 70.1% of the population identify as Christian, with Catholics (37.9%) making up the largest denomination, followed by Anglican (7.6%), United Church (7.3%), and other denominations. Others identify as Muslim (4%), Hindu (2.1%), Sikh (1.4%), Buddhist (0.8%), Jewish (0.5%) and with other religions. 20.6% of the population report no religious affiliation.

Economy
The top employers in Oakville include:

Employers
Sagen MI Canada (TSX:MIC) and Mattamy Homes are based in Oakville  while Siemens, The Ford Motor Company, and MADD Canada have their head Canadian offices in the town. Many Oakville residents work in advanced manufacturing at large facilities operated by UTC Aerospace Systems and General Electric.

Many Oakville companies fall under the life science umbrella, with an emphasis on pharmaceuticals and elder care. There are also a number of retirement homes in the city.

As Oakville is considered part of the Greater Toronto Area it is common for residents to commute to jobs in Toronto.

Arts and culture

Oakville Centre for the Performing Arts
The Oakville Centre for the Performing Arts houses several performances by local and international artists. It is also the performing venue for the Oakville Symphony Orchestra, the Oakville Children's Choir and the Oakville Ballet Company. The Oakville Arts Council provides further artistic talents in the town showcasing films, literary figures and visual arts.

The Oakville Children's Choir
The Oakville Children's Choir has been in business since 1994.

Oakville Galleries 
Oakville Galleries is a not-for-profit art museum that exhibits contemporary art, cares for a permanent collection and delivers public programming. Its exhibition spaces are located on two sites: Gairloch Gardens and Centennial Square.

Events

Downtown Oakville Jazz Festival
The Downtown Oakville Jazz Festival is an annual summer jazz festival established in 1992. The event includes performances at a number of stages along Lakeshore Road in downtown Oakville. The event is free to the public.

Waterfront Festival
Beginning in 1982, Oakville's Coronation Park played host to the annual Oakville Waterfront Festival. Among a range of events, the festival included small amusement park rides, arts and crafts, food and drinks, free concerts headlined by Canadian bands, and nightly fireworks displays. The Waterfront Festival took place in late June of each year until 2010, when it was cancelled due to financial difficulties, despite having annual attendance of up to 100,000 visitors. It returned in August 2013, which was the most recent festival to date.

Kerrfest
The Kerrfest is an annual outdoor music festival that takes place in early September in Oakville. Having begun in 2014, the event includes free performances and is open to the public, located at Westwood Park.

For the Love of the Arts Festival
The For the Love of the Arts Festival is an annual event taking place in the late spring in Oakville. Inaugurated in 2002, the event is hosted by CommUnity Arts Space (originally known as Music and Art Shared Space who initiated the festival), a local umbrella group advocating for shared physical space for Oakville's arts and cultural groups. Currently the only such multi-disciplinary community festival of its kind in Oakville, the event serves to showcase local talent, skills, crafts, literary art, dance performances, theatre groups and music performances. The event is intended as a symbolic presentation of a "shared space" and is entirely sponsored by local corporate and private donations.

Shopping
The Oakville Place Shopping Centre is an indoor shopping mall in Oakville that opened in 1981.

Sports

Athletics
The Oakville Half Marathon is an annual half marathon event held in Shell Park, with sub-events in 10K, 5K, and 2K Fun Run/Walk.

Golf
Glen Abbey Golf Course is located in Oakville.  Designed by Jack Nicklaus, the course has hosted 30 Canadian Open championships since it opened in 1977, and both Golf Canada and the Canadian Golf Hall of Fame are located there. In 2018, the owner, Clublink, planned to demolish the golf course in order to build residential and commercial properties.  In 2021, following objections from the community and municipal government, Clublink withdraw its development plan and stated it would continue operating Glen Abbey as a golf course.

Soccer
The Oakville Blue Devils of League 1 Ontario is a professional soccer team. The Blue Devils are affiliated with the Oakville Soccer Club, which is the largest soccer club in Canada. Oakville boasts over 60 soccer fields and a Soccer Club Facility with a two-star, full-size, FIFA-Certified indoor soccer pitch.

Lacrosse
Oakville is home to the headquarters and practice facilities of the Toronto Rock professional box lacrosse team competing in the National Lacrosse League. Oakville is also home to the 3rd largest minor lacrosse association in Ontario: The Oakville Minor Lacrosse Association has more than 1,500 players and competes in multiple classes and multiple divisions. The town also has the Oakville Buzz, a Junior "A" lacrosse team who won the Founders Cup in 2006. The current rep lacrosse team is the Oakville Hawks.

Hockey

The Oakville Blades is a Tier II Junior "A" franchise since 1966, and a "AAA" hockey system. The current rep hockey team for boys  in Oakville is Oakville Rangers, who are the 2-time defending champions for the Midget "AAA" group. For girls, there is the Oakville Hornets, who are the largest female hockey association in the world.

Skating
Skate Oakville, which is headquartered at Oakville's Sixteen Mile Creek Sports Complex, was recently the largest skating club in Canada, providing learn to skate lessons, recreational figure skating programs, competitive training, and 10 synchronized skating teams.

Baseball
Baseball is represented in Oakville by two organizations: Oakville Little League and the OMBA (Oakville Minor Baseball Association).

Oakville Little League is the largest Little League organization in Canada. In 2018, there were over 1,150 young people playing across eight divisions and over 90 teams, including seven All-Star teams. Oakville Little League also fields six All-Star (Rep) teams, known as the Oakville Whitecaps. The 12U and 14U Whitecaps teams compete annually to play in the Little League World Series and Junior League World Series, respectively.

The OMBA (Oakville Minor Baseball Association) was established in 1963. It offers three levels of baseball to children and youth in Oakville: House League, Select and Rep. OMBA runs the Oakville A's, the official Town Rep baseball playing in the Central Ontario Baseball Association (COBA) system.

Canoeing
Burloak Canoe Club is located in Oakville.  Three Olympians, Adam van Koeverden, Mark Oldershaw and Larry Cain, trained at the club.

Swimming 
Oakville Aquatic Club is a competitive swim club, catering to every level of swimmer, from novice swim lessons to high performance coaching since 1968.

Government

Municipal and regional
At the municipal level, the governing body is the Oakville Town Council consisting of a mayor (currently Rob Burton) and fourteen councillors. The town is divided into seven wards, with two councillors elected by residents of each ward.

In each ward, one councillor represents the ward solely on the Oakville Town Council, and the other is a member of the 21-member governing council of the Regional Municipality of Halton, in addition to being a member of the 14-member Town Council.

Provincial

Two provincial ridings are situated in Oakville, which use the same boundaries as the federal ridings and are currently represented provincially by:

 Oakville: Stephen Crawford (Conservative)
Oakville North-Burlington: Effie Triantafilopoulos (Conservative)

Federal
Two federal ridings are situated in Oakville, which are currently represented by:

 Oakville: Anita Anand (Liberal)
 Oakville North-Burlington: Pam Damoff (Liberal)

Infrastructure

Transportation
Oakville Transit provides local bus service. GO Transit commuter rail and bus service operates from Bronte and Oakville stations. Via Rail services along the line between Windsor and Quebec corridor, and operates from Oakville station.

Several major roads and highways go through Oakville:

  Queen Elizabeth Way
  Ontario Highway 403
  407 ETR
 
The Queen Elizabeth Way and Ontario Highway 403 run concurrently throughout most of Oakville.

Emergency services
Law enforcement in Oakville is performed by the Halton Regional Police Service.

Fire service is provided by the Oakville Fire Department with its nine fire stations.

The Town of Oakville's Waters Air Rescue Force is a volunteer organization that provides marine search and rescue service in Western Lake Ontario. It was founded in 1954 and was a charter member of the Canadian Coast Guard Auxiliary.

Education

Elementary schools and high schools in Oakville are a mix of private and public schools, with one of the highest ratios of private schools to student population in the country. Oakville is covered by the Halton District School Board, Halton Catholic District School Board, Conseil scolaire Viamonde, and Conseil scolaire catholique MonAvenir. St. Thomas Aquinas Catholic Secondary School (Oakville) and White Oaks Secondary School both offer the International Baccalaureate Program.

The town is home to Appleby College, a private school for grades seven to twelve, established in 1911 as well as St. Mildred's-Lightbourn School, an independent all-girls school. Oakville is also home to the Trafalgar Campus of Sheridan College, primarily an arts and business studies institute, and Oakville's only higher education facility.

Media
Oakville is primarily served by media based in Toronto with markets in the Greater Toronto Area (GTA) that cover most of the news in the GTA. One regional newspaper, the Oakville Beaver, is published once weekly. The monthly magazines Neighbours of Joshua Creek, Neighbours of Glen Abbey and Neighbours of Olde Oakville serve three key neighbourhoods. The town is also served by Oakvillenews.org, a locally owned online daily newsletter and website.

The town also has two specialty radio stations: AM 1250 CJYE, a Christian music station and AM 1320 CJMR, a Multicultural station.

The following national cable television station also broadcast from Oakville:

The Weather Network has broadcast nationally from Oakville since 2005.
 The Hamilton-based television station CHCH-DT serves Hamilton, Halton and Niagara, thus including Oakville. CHCH recently closed its Halton Bureau (due to budget considerations) which was located in downtown Oakville.
TVCogeco from the studio in the Cogeco Cable Headquarters at Harvester Road & Burloak Drive, just inside of Burlington.

Sister cities
Oakville is twinned with the following cities:

  Dorval, Quebec, Canada (1957)
  Neyagawa, Osaka, Japan (April 6, 1984)
  Huai'an, Jiangsu, China (June, 2015)

The town of Oakville has named two streets after Dorval and Neyagawa.

See also 

 :Category:People from Oakville, Ontario
 List of people from Oakville, Ontario
 List of schools in Oakville, Ontario

Notes

References

External links 

 

 
Lower-tier municipalities in Ontario
Populated places on Lake Ontario in Canada
Towns in Ontario
1827 establishments in Canada
Populated places on the Underground Railroad
Populated places established in 1827